Denis Žvegelj (born 24 June 1972) is an ex Slovenian rower and Olympic medallist. He was born in Jesenice, SR Slovenia.

Rowing Achievements

Olympic Games 
1992: Barcelona (SPA) – 3rd place (coxless pair with Iztok Čop)
1996: Atlanta (USA) – 4th place (coxless four with Sadik Mujkić, Milan Janša, Jani Klemenčič)

World Rowing Junior Championships: 
 1989: Szeged (HUN) – 1st place (coxless pair with Iztok Čop) 
 1990: Aiguebelette (FRA) – 1st place (coxless pair with Iztok Čop)

World Championships: 
 1990: Lake Barrington (AUS) – 7th place (coxless four with Sadik Mujkić, Bojan Prešern, Iztok Čop)
 1991: Vienna (AUT) – 2nd place (coxless pair with Iztok Čop)
 1993: Roudnice (CZE) – 3rd place (coxless pair with Iztok Čop)
 1995: Tampere (FIN) – 8th place (coxless four with Sadik Mujkić, Milan Janša, Jani Klemenčič)
 1997: Aiguebelette (FRA) – 4th place (coxless four with Sadik Mujkić, Milan Janša, Jani Klemenčič)

Career
In 1998 he founded an engineering firm Basing
On 16 March 2009 Denis has been elected to become President of Slovenian Rowing Federation for the time period 2009–2013
2012–2014 CEO Vile Bled
2015 founded Revive Temple Bled

Bio
Denis started rowing at the age of 12 at local rowing club in his hometown Bled.
Serious rowing racing started in the coxless pair with Iztok Čop, when they won two junior world championships in a row (1989, 1990), then they finished 2nd in the World Championships in 1991, and won Bronze at the Barcelona Olympics in 1992 with Iztok Čop (the first Olympic medal for independent Slovenia).  In 1993 Denis and Iztok got bronze medal despite Denis's severe shoulder injury after bicycle accident.  Denis carried on with going to study in US at Brown University where he was rowing for men Brown Crew and studying Mechanical Engineering.  He was member of, at that time, unbeatable Brown varsity eight, which also won National Collegiate Rowing Championship in years 1994 and 1995.

After return for summer holidays in 1994, he got in a car accident which prevented him to finish rowing season in pair with Iztok Čop, who went on in single to 1994 WRC.  Only a few months later, another rower, Sašo Mirjanič from Slovenian four, died in car accident.  So next year Denis, joined other three boys from four, to qualify for 96 Olympics.  There they achieved 4th place in an incredible fours race, where all six boats were even almost from start to finish line.  As next year's similar scenario repeated in WRC in France, when Slovenia was already called to pick up bronze medal, and later (after detail photo finish examination) moved to 4th place, and due to back problems, he finished his career.

Denis than focused in working, along with his father, in their machining design firm Basing in neighboring town Jesenice, which was moved to Bled in Jan. 2006.

2012 he formed a small Hotel chain at the lake Bled Vile Bled and later extend his work to alternative healing to promote bio-energy healing and learning.
Since 2015 he runs independent healing, revitalizing and learning center Revive Temple Bled to promote healthy life style and self-healing through proper nutrition, use of bio-energy and detoxification.

Denis is a father of three sons Gal (17 March 1994), Maksim (25 September 1998) and Isak (3 July 2000) and lives his hometown of Bled.

References

External links
DatabaseOlympics.com profile
News Dnevnik 17.03.2009

1972 births
Living people
Slovenian male rowers
Olympic rowers of Slovenia
Rowers at the 1992 Summer Olympics
Rowers at the 1996 Summer Olympics
Olympic bronze medalists for Slovenia
Olympic medalists in rowing
World Rowing Championships medalists for Slovenia
Medalists at the 1992 Summer Olympics
World Rowing Championships medalists for Yugoslavia
Sportspeople from Jesenice, Jesenice